Astoria Bydgoszcz, also known as simply Astoria, is a Polish multi-sports club most known for the professional men's basketball team, based in Bydgoszcz. Playing in the Polish Basketball League and in the past in the FIBA Korać Cup.

History

In the 2018–19 season, Astoria defeated Śląsk Wrocław in the finals of the play-offs, thus crowning itself I Liga champions. The accomplishment gained the club promotion to the Polish Basketball League (PLK), for the first time in 13 years. Astoria Bydgoszcz also has a reserve team that plays in Polish third-tier level II Liga.
The Astoria U-18 team won the Polish Championship in 1987 and became 2nd in 1988. The U-16 team won the Polish Championship in 1985 and became 2nd also in 1988.

Honours
I Liga
 Winners (3): 1988–89, 2002–03, 2018–19

Current roster

Team names
Weltinex Astoria Bydgoszcz (1990–1991) 
Polfrost Astoria Bydgoszcz (1991–1992) 
Domar Astoria Bydgoszcz (1994)
Samsung Astoria Bydgoszcz (1994–1995) 
BFM Astoria Bydgoszcz (1995–1996)
Kujawiak-Astoria Bydgoszcz (1997–2000)
Astoria Bydgoszcz (2000–2002)
Wody Mineralne Ostromecko Astoria Bydgoszcz (2002) 
KPSW Astoria Bydgoszcz (2007)
Enea Astoria Bydgoszcz (2017–2021)
Enea Abramczyk Astoria Bydgoszcz (2021–present)

Seasons in the Polish Basketball League
1989–1990 - 12th place (relegation)
1991–1992 - 7th place (withdrawn)
2003–2004 - 8th place 
2004–2005 – 5th place 
2005–2006 – 9th place (withdrawn)
2019–2020 – 11th place
2020–2021 – 11th place
2021–2022 – 9th place

Results in European competitions

Former notable players

  Filip Dylewicz
  Kęstutis Marčiulionis
  Andrius Jurkūnas
  Augenijus Vaškys
  Dante Swanson
  Ed O'Bannon
  Dennis Mims
  Kevin Fletcher
  Arvydas Čepulis
  J. P. Prince
  Kris Clyburn

Retired numbers
 4 Dorian Szyttenholm
 6 Sebastian Laydych
 7 Przemysław Gierszewski

Former coaches

  Zygmunt Weigt			
  Henryk Pietrzak
  Aureliusz Gościniak 
  Roman Haber 
  Hilary Gierszewski
  Maciej Mackiewicz
  Jerzy Nowakowski 
  Alexander Krutikov 
  Ryszard Mogiełka
  Adam Ziemiński
  Wojciech Krajewski
  Tomasz Herkt
  Jerzy Chudeusz 
  Jarosław Zawadka
  Maciej Borkowski
  Przemysław Gierszewski
  Konrad Kaźmierczyk
  Artur Gronek  
 Marek Popiołek

Other Sections

Boxing
 Jerzy Adamski
 Aleksy Kuziemski

Canoeing
 Dariusz Białkowski
 Zdzisław Szubski
 Sebastian Szubski

Swimming
 Alicja Pęczak
 Zbigniew Januszkiewicz

In past
 Association football
 Athletics
 Disabled sports
 Fencing
 Gymnastics
 Ice skating
 Table tennis
 Tennis
 Volleyball

References

External links
Official site

 
Basketball teams in Poland
Sport in Bydgoszcz
Multi-sport clubs in Poland
Basketball teams established in 1924